Paasonvuori (also (short) ) — the mountain (rock, height) near Sortavala, Russia.

Height - 79.2 m.

The Хелюлянйоки river (pictured) flows under the mountain, as well as the Кармаланъярви lake  stretch.

According to archaeologists, there was a settlement Паасо on the mountain, however, local residents deny the existence of a settlement.

References

Sources 
 Кочкуркина, Светлана Ивановна. Археологические памятники Корелы V—XV вв. Л.: «Наука», Ленинградское отделение, 1981 — Всего страниц: 158
 Карелия. Межозёрье
 Вокруг Ладоги
 Ancient_Hillforts_of_Finland

Mountains under 1000 metres
Mountains of Russia